David-Hillel Ruben is a University of London professor emeritus of philosophy, now at Birkbeck, University of London. He gained his PhD in Philosophy at Harvard University (1971). He previously held posts at the Universities of Edinburgh and Glasgow, Essex University, The City University London, and the London School of Economics. He served as Founding Director of NYU's campus programme in London. His research relates to the philosophy of the social sciences, metaphysics, and the philosophy of action. In 2011, Ruben resigned from the Universities and Colleges Union (UCU) in protest at their stance on anti-Semitism.

Selected publications
Marxism and Materialism, Harvester and Humanities, 1977, 2nd edition, 1979.
The Metaphysics of the Social World, Routledge and Kegan Paul, 1985.
Explaining Explanation, Routledge, 1990. Second edition, Paradigm Publishers, 2012.
  Editor, Explanation, Readings in Philosophy Series, Oxford University Press, 1993.
Action and Its Explanations, Oxford University Press, 2003.
 The Metaphysics of Action, Palgrave Macmillan, 2018.
 ‘Traditions and True Successors’, Social Epistemology, January 2013, Vol. 27, No. 1, pp 32–46.
 ‘Trying in Some Way’, Australasian Journal of Philosophy, December 2013, Vol. 91, No. 4, pp 719–733. 
 'A Conditional Theory of Trying', Philosophical Studies, 173 (1), January 2016, 271-287. 
 ’One-Particularism in the Theory of Action’, Philosophical Studies, Vol. 175, Issue 11, 2677-2694, Nov. 2018.
 'Prime Cuts and the Method of Recombination', Episteme, Vol. 19 (1), March 2022, 21-30.

References 

Living people
Year of birth missing (living people)
Jewish philosophers
Academics of Birkbeck, University of London
Dartmouth College alumni
Harvard University alumni
Academics of the London School of Economics
Place of birth missing (living people)